Lynne Avril Evans  (born 5 August 1948 in Birmingham) is a retired British archer. She competed at the 1972 Olympics and finished in 16th place.

She was appointed MBE in the 1997 Birthday Honours.

References

1948 births
Sportspeople from Pontypridd
Welsh female archers
Archers at the 1972 Summer Olympics
Members of the Order of the British Empire
Olympic archers of Great Britain
Living people